Chen Jinhua (July 1929 – 2 July 2016) was a Chinese politician. Chen joined the Chinese Communist Party in February 1949 and studied at Renmin University of China from 1953 to 1955 and from 1960 to 1962. From the 1950s through the 1970s, he served in positions of increasing responsibility in China's former Ministry of Textile Industry and Ministry of Light Industry. From 1977 to 1983, Chen served on the Standing Committee of the Shanghai Municipal People's Congress, as well as deputy secretary of the Shanghai CPC Committee. From 1983 to 1990, he served as the general manager and Party Secretary of state-owned oil company Sinopec.

In 1990, Chen was named the chairman of the former State Commission on Economic Structure Reform, and from 1993 to 1998 he served as the chairman of the State Planning Commission of China, the precursor to the current National Development and Reform Commission. From 1998 to 2003, he served as a vice-chairman of the Chinese People's Political Consultative Conference.

Honors
:
 Grand Cordon of the Order of the Rising Sun (05 Nov 2008)

References

1929 births
2016 deaths
Chinese Communist Party politicians from Anhui
People's Republic of China politicians from Anhui
Politicians from Chizhou
Vice Chairpersons of the National Committee of the Chinese People's Political Consultative Conference
Grand Cordons of the Order of the Rising Sun